Radio Italia Solo Musica Italiana is an Italian music radio station based in Cologno Monzese, Italy, entirely devoted to Easy listening Italian music. It was the first to use this format in Italy.
It was founded in 1982 by the Italian musician and composer Mario Volanti.
In 1990 it was the most listened to commercial radio station in Italy.

In 1996 it expand its coverage using the satellite. In 1997 it launced its website and since November 12, 2002 it started to do streaming with Windows Media.
Besides FM in Italy, Albania, France, Switzerland, DTT and DAB (Italy and Ticino), cable radio (only in Switzerland) and Free to Air on Hotbird 8, it is also available on SKY Italia and Dish Network.
In 2007 had 3.776.000 average listeners in Italy.

In the 90s a second station was born with the name of Radio Italia Anni 60, airing in syndication on Italian soil and broadcasting music from 60s, 70s and 80s.
One of the shows of the radio was Rit Parade, hosted in the weekend by Stefano Cilio, presenting a selection of the most popular Italian songs.

See also 
 Video Italia
 Radio Italia TV

References

External links 
 Official Website 

1982 establishments in Italy
Free-to-air
Radio stations established in 1982
Cable radio
Radio stations in Italy
Mass media in Cologno Monzese